Free State Stars Football club is a South African professional football club based in Bethlehem, Free State that plays in the National First Division. Formerly known as Makwane Computer Stars and Qwa Qwa Stars, their most significant honour is winning the 1994 Coca-Cola Cup and 2018 Nedbank Cup.

The club sold their National First Division status to Casric F.C. at the start of the 2022–23 season. Following the sale of Bloemfontein Celtic the previous year, this left the Free State without any representatives in professional football.

History
Founded in 1977 in a small village of Makwane in an area then known as QwaQwa, the club gained promotion to the National Premier Soccer League in 1986.

The team won the league cup (then known as The Coca-Cola Cup) in 1994 with Bunene Ngaduane leading the scoring charts.

To avoid fixture congestion the club's franchise was sold to the Premier Soccer League in 2002.

The following year, Mike Mokoena revived the club as he bought and renamed the franchise of National First Division side Maholosiane. FS Stars regained their Premiership status in 2005 after winning the Mvela Golden League.

After a disappointing season in the top-flight, with the first team finishing bottom of the table, the club was relegated. The 2007–08 season however proved to be a huge success with Stars dominating the First Division and securing promotion to the Premier League once again.

They also won the inaugural Baymed Cup in December 2006 beating FC AK in the final.

Shirt sponsor & kit manufacturer
Shirt sponsor: 
Kit manufacturer: Lotto

Honours
Nedbank Cup:
Winners – 2018

Coca-Cola Cup:
Winners – 1994

Baymed Cup:
Winners – 2006

Mvela Golden League:
Champions – 2004–05, 2006–07

Second Division:
Champions – 1985

Club records
Most appearances:  Edward Salomane 299
Most goals:  Bunene Ngaduane 79
Most capped player:  Kennedy Mweene
Most appearances in a season:  Themba Sithole 45 (1992)
Most goals in a season:  Bunene Ngaduane 19 (1993)
Record win: 8–1 v Ikapa Sporting (29 March 2008, Nedbank Cup)
Record loss: 1–7 v Arcadia (31 October 1986, NSL), 1–7 v Mamelodi Sundowns (19 April 1998, PSL)

Premier Soccer League record
2018–19 – 16th (relegated)
2017–18 – 6th
2016–17 – 14th
2015–16 – 12th
2014–15 – 9th
2013–14 – 14th
2012–13 – 7th
2011–12 – 6th
2010–11 – 9th
2009–10 – 13th
2008–09 – 4th
2007–08 – 5th
2005–06 – 16th (relegated)
2001–02 – 11th (bought out)
2000–01 – 6th
1999–2000 – 15th
1998–99 – 6th
1997–98 – 9th
1996–97 – 13th

Club officials
Chairman:  Mike Mokoena Deceased 17 June 2020
General manager:  Rantsi Mokoena
Football manager:  Kootso Mokoena

First team squad
Updated 16 May 2020

Notable former coaches

 Milo Bjelica (1992)
 Clive Hachilensa (2005–07)
 Kinnah Phiri (1 July 2007 – 8 May 2008)
 David Duncan (1 July 2008 – 18 Aug 2008)
 Owen Da Gama (19 Aug 2008 – 7 Oct 2008)
 Themba Sithole (14 Oct 2008 – 17 Nov 2008)
 Steve Komphela (18 Nov 2008 – 30 June 2009)
 Themba Sithole (interim) (1 July 2009 – 14 Sept 2009)
 Valinhos (15 Sept 2009 – 3 Oct 2009)
 Themba Sithole (4 Oct 2009 – 15 Nov 2009)
 Gordon Igesund (16 Nov 2009 – 23 March 2010)
 Sunday Chidzambwa (5 May 2010 – 19 Sept 2010)
 Steve Komphela (20 Oct 2010 – 1 Dec 2013)
 Themba Sithole (interim) (1 Dec 2013 – 14 March 2014)
 Kinnah Phiri (15 March 2014 – 30 June 2014)
 Tom Saintfiet (2 July 2014 – 6 Nov 2014)
 Kinnah Phiri (7 Nov 2014 – Aug 2015)
 Ernst Middendorp (Sept 2015 – Dec 2015)
 Giovanni Solinas (Dec 2015 – 23 May 2016)
 Denis Lavagne (22 June 2016 – 22 September 2016)

References

External links
 
Premier Soccer League
PSL Club Info
South African Football Association
Confederation of African Football

 
Soccer clubs in South Africa
Association football clubs established in 1977
Premier Soccer League clubs
Soccer clubs in the Free State (province)
National First Division clubs
1977 establishments in South Africa
Sport in the Free State (province)